The Lago di Piana degli Albanesi is an artificial lake in Piana degli Albanesi, in the Province of Palermo, Sicily, Italy.

The lake was made to produce electricity.  It was built from 1920 to 1923 by hand.  The output water jump 475 m lower until the Casuzze hydro-electrical plant near Palermo.  In the 1960s, to supply the increased demand of electricity, a newer plant just near the dam was built, which is still in function.

Lakes of Sicily